James Cyril Bolger (February 23, 1932 – April 9, 2020) was an American professional baseball outfielder. He appeared in 312 games over all or parts of seven Major League Baseball (MLB) seasons, but spent over two-thirds of his big-league playing time — 260 games — as a member of the Chicago Cubs. Bolger had short stints with the Cincinnati Reds (nine games), Cleveland Indians (eight), and Philadelphia Phillies (35 games). His MLB totals included 140 hits, 14 doubles, six triples, and six home runs, with a career batting average of .229. Bolger threw and batted right-handed.

Born in Cincinnati, Ohio, Bolger attended Purcell Marian High School. He began his pro career with the  Reds, also playing Minor League Baseball (MiLB) in their farm system.

On October 14, 1951, Bolger was traded by the Cincinnati Redlegs to Buffalo for pitchers Moe Savransky and Tom Acker. 

Bolger's best MLB season came in 1957. He spent the full season with the Cubs as their fourth outfielder, appeared in 112 games (starting 57, including two starts as a third baseman), and batted a career-high .275, in 273 at-bats. The previous year, Bolger had been named a Pacific Coast League (PCL) all-star, after he batted .326, with 147 runs batted in, 193 hits, and 28 home runs, as a member of the Los Angeles Angels.

Bolger's 13-year professional career ended in 1962, after he batted .319 for the Triple-A Louisville Colonels.

Bolger died on April 9, 2020 at the age of 88.

References

External links

1932 births
2020 deaths
Baseball players from Cincinnati
Burlington Flints players
Charleston Senators players
Chicago Cubs players
Cincinnati Redlegs players
Cincinnati Reds players
Cleveland Indians players
Columbia Reds players
Little Rock Travelers players
Los Angeles Angels (minor league) players
Louisville Colonels (minor league) players
Major League Baseball outfielders
Philadelphia Phillies players
Sacramento Solons players
San Diego Padres (minor league) players
Tulsa Oilers (baseball) players
Williamsport Tigers players
Xavier University alumni